Democratic Reform Party may refer to:

 Partido ng Demokratikong Reporma – Lapiang Manggagawa, a Philippines political party
 A former Japanese political party, see Liberalism in Japan
 Party for Democratic Reforms (Azerbaijan), an Azerbaijani political party
 Democratic Reform Party (South Africa)
 A split from the US Democratic Party in the New York state election, 1894
 Reformist Democratic Party, a Bolivian political party